"Elis" is a song composed by the Electro-Gothic metal band Erben der Schöpfung, from its 2001 debut album Twilight.

History 
The song is also a poem of Georg Trakl named "An den Knaben Elis".

Track listing

Elis - 5:53
Elis (English version) - 5:53 
Elis (Remix by NoyceTM) - 5:47 
Elis (Remix by Spiritual Cramp) - 6:09

Release
Elis was released on 23 April 2001 over M.O.S. Records and the re-release was on January 1, 2003 from the German label Napalm Records.

Credits 
 Sabine Dünser - Vocals
 Oliver Falk - Keyboards
 Pete Streit - Guitar
 Tom Saxer - Guitar
 Jürgen Broger - Bass
 Franky Koller - Drums

References

2001 songs
2001 debut singles
Erben der Schöpfung songs